Pseudatemelia detrimentella is a moth of the family Oecophoridae. It was described by Staudinger in 1859. It is found in Spain and Portugal.

The wingspan is about 17 mm.

References

Moths described in 1859
Amphisbatinae